Guatemala is a country in Central America.

Places
Guatemala may also refer to:
Guatemala City, the capital of Guatemala
Guatemala Department, a department of Guatemala
Guatemala, Cuba, a village in the Holguín Province
Captaincy General of Guatemala, was an administrative division of the Spanish Empire in Central America
 Guatemala, San Sebastián, Puerto Rico, a barrio

Other
Guatemala (song), single by hip hop artist Swae Lee